"A Cambio de Que" (In Exchange for What) is a song written by Xavier Santos Córtes and first recorded in 1983 by  Mexican band "Los Diablos."  Marisela, an American born singer of Mexican heritage sang a version modified to reflect a female voice in her studio album Completamente Tuya. The song has been covered by several artists which have ranked on the music charts. Latin pop band Corvo covered the song in 1999 which reached number 18 on the Hot Latin Songs chart in the United States. American singer Huey Dunbar recorded "A Cambio de Que" on his debut studio album Yo Si Me Enamoré (2001). This version peaked at number 16 on the Tropical Songs chart. Mexican duranguense band Alacranes Musical covered the song on the album of the same name in 2004 which reached number 25 on the Regional Mexican Airplay chart.

Jenni Rivera version

In 2011, Mexican-American singer Jenni Rivera covered "A Cambio de Que" on her twelfth studio album Joyas Prestadas. She recorded the song in Latin pop and banda for both the pop and banda versions of Joyas Prestadas. Both versions of "A Cambio de Qué" were released as the second single from the album on August 29, 2011. In the United States, the song peaked at number 49 on the Billboard Hot Latin Songs chart and number 21 on the Billboard Regional Mexican Songs chart. The song was awarded a Lo Nuestro award for Pop Song of the Year.

Chart performance

References

1985 songs
1999 singles
2001 singles
2002 singles
2004 singles
2012 singles
Marisela songs
Jenni Rivera songs
Fonovisa Records singles